Arthur John MacLean (6 July 1858 – 24 February 1943) was an Anglican bishop in the later decades of the 19th century and first four of the 20th century.

Maclean was born into an ecclesiastical family. His father, the Rev Arthur J. Macleane (he later dropped the final "e" from the surname), began a career in the East India Company before returning to England, obtaining a degree from Trinity College, Cambridge, being ordained and securing appointment as inaugural Principal of Brighton College (1846–51). He held two subsequent headships and was editor of various Classical texts, especially Horace and Juvenal.

Maclean was educated at Eton College and King's College, Cambridge. He was ordained in 1882 and he was head of the Archbishop of Canterbury's Assyrian Mission from 1886 to 1891 and then Rector of Portree. In 1882 he became Dean of Argyll and The Isles and after this was Rector of Selkirk before a spell as Principal of the Scottish Episcopal Theological College and then a nearly 40 years episcopacy as Bishop of Moray, Ross and Caithness. Late in his life he was additionally elected Primus of the Scottish Episcopal Church. An eminent author, he died on 24 February 1943.

Writings
Grammar of the Dialects of Vernacular Syriac, 1895
Dictionary of the Dialects of Vernacular Syriac, 1901
The Ancient Church Orders, 1910
The Didache, 1922

References

Sources
J.F.Coakley. The Church of the East and the Church of England:a history of the Archbishop of Canterbury's Assyrian Mission, Oxford, 1992.

1858 births
1943 deaths
People educated at Eton College
Alumni of King's College, Cambridge
Deans of Argyll and The Isles
Bishops of Moray, Ross and Caithness
20th-century Scottish Episcopalian bishops
Primuses of the Scottish Episcopal Church
20th-century Anglican archbishops